A Parish Assembly in Jersey is the decision-making body of local government, comprising ratepayers (including mandataires) and electors of the parish.

The Parish Assembly:
sets the annual domestic rate according to the budget proposed by the Connétable;
elects members of the municipality, including the Roads Committee, Roads Inspectors, Vingteniers, Constable's Officers;
recommends liquor licences to the licensing bench;
adopts road names;
authorises the Procureurs du Bien Public to enter into contracts in the name of the parish;
may discuss other matters as proposed by the Connétable, or at the written request of a number of members of the Assembly

Municipal structure

Each parish is headed by a Constable (French: Connétable; Jèrriais: Connêtabl'ye) who is elected for a three-year period by the residents of the Parish.

The Constable is assisted in all matters by a Parish Municipality which consists of two Procureurs du Bien Public.

Vingtaines

The Parish is further divided into Vingtaines (or in Saint Ouen cueillettes). Each vingtaine is represented by two Vingteniers, two Roads Inspectors and three Constable's Officers. All are elected and sworn officers of the Royal Court.

Roads Committee

A Roads Committee of five elected principals is also available to offer advice on a range of issues; chiefly related to the roads. Centeniers are the highest ranking police officers in Jersey and are elected.

In Jersey, the Roads Committee (French: Comité des Chemins) is the highway authority for Parish roads in each Parish. In accordance with the Loi (1914) sur la Voirie it superintends the repair and maintenance of by-roads in the Parish, establishes boundary stones, issues Choses Publiques licenses, examines planning applications that fall within its responsibilities, supervises refuse collection, adjudicates fines during the Visite du Branchage, and proposes new road names, as may be necessary, for approval by the Parish Assembly. The Connétable presides over the Roads Committee which also includes the Rector and three Principals of the Parish [five Principals for St Helier] elected for a term of three years by the Parish Assembly.

Instructions are passed to Roads Inspectors whose duty it is to ensure that the repairs are carried out.

In St. Helier, the larger Roads Committee also undertakes additional non-statutory responsibilities with regard to parks and other matters, and acts, in the absence of a municipal council, as an advisory body to the Connétable. By convention, the two Procureur du Bien Public of St. Helier attend meetings of the Roads Committee, but cannot vote.

Roads Inspectors

The Parish Assembly elects two Roads Inspectors for each Vingtaine [or Cueillette in St Ouen] for a three-year term of office in accordance with the Loi (1914) sur la Voirie. Roads Inspectors are responsible for the repair of by-roads of the Parish and have to ensure the instructions of the Roads Committee are carried out.

In the Parish of St Helier, the Roads Inspectors also undertake additional non-statutory responsibilities with regard to the policing of infractions of the Road Traffic Act (Jersey) and other areas of the law within the parochial remit such as dog licensing and fly posting. They also serve as conduits of information to the Honorary Police.

Their chief role is the annual Visite du Branchage and the triennial Visite Royale.

Supplementary bodies are also elected to serve specific needs; in the largest parish St Helier these include; the Accounts Committee, the Welfare Board, and the Youth Council.

Matters of import are brought before a gathering of the municipality and members of the public for consideration and vote.

Honorary Police Officers

There is an Honorary Police (French: Police Honorifique) force in each parish in Jersey.

Honorary Police officers have, for centuries, been elected by parishioners to assist the Connétable of the Parish to maintain law and order. Officers are elected as Centeniers, Vingteniers or Constable's Officers each with various duties and responsibilities. Centeniers are the highest ranking police officers in Jersey and are elected.

The Honorary Police provided the only law enforcement prior to the appointment of paid Police officers for the Parish of Saint Helier in 1853 and later to serve the whole Island. The Honorary Police still provide an essential and very valuable service to the Parish and community.

Each Parish Assembly elects a number of Centeniers, Vingteniers and Constable's Officers who act in the name of the Connétable of the Parish in maintaining law and order. These officers are elected for a period of three years and take an oath in the Royal Court.

All Honorary Police officers must live in the Parish at the time of their first election or, in the case of St Helier, be a ratepayer or mandataire of that Parish. If an officer moves out of the Parish during her/his term of office, s/he may continue her/his term of office with the approval of Her Majesty's Attorney General and the Connétable of the Parish and may stand for re-election provided there is no break in service.

A person may be nominated for election as a member of the Honorary Police if, on the day of nomination, s/he is at least 20 years of age and less than 70 years of age.

Honorary Police officers are on duty for one week at a time, usually every 3 or 4 weeks depending upon the roster within the Parish, and are on call 24 hours a day during that period. Honorary Police officers are elected to serve the Parish but in certain circumstances may assist or operate outside the Parish.

Anyone standing for election as a member of the Honorary Police will have to undergo a criminal record check.

Ecclesiastical Assembly 
In order to maintain the historic ties to the Church of England a Rectorate comprising the Connétable and Procureurs, and the Rector and Churchwardens oversees the operation of the largest church within the Parochial boundary. Decisions regarding the operation of the Church are made by an Ecclesiastical Assembly which is composed of the same persons as the Parish Assembly.

References

External links
Loi (1804) au sujet des assemblées paroissiales 
Loi (1905) au sujet des assemblées paroissiales 

Parochial politics of Jersey
Parishes of Jersey
Government of Jersey
Political organisations based in Jersey
Jersey law
Youth councils
Jersey